Cynthia Basinet is an American actress and singer, born in the San Fernando Valley in Los Angeles. She is also noted for being a friend and lover of Jack Nicholson

Career
She started as a model for I. Magnin and later became a model for Bob Mackie. After that, she worked in a San Francisco modeling agency. She spent the next five years in Europe modeling, including campaigns for Benetton with photographer, Oliviero Toscani. In the 1990s, she starred in the movies Last Dance, The Making of a Hollywood Madam, A Hard Death, and has also appeared in the "Last Man on Earth" segment of the Beyond Belief: Fact or Fiction TV series.

Basinet released her first album, For You With Love in 2001 under the name "C. Basinet".  It included "Santa Baby", which was originally recorded as a gift to actor Jack Nicholson in 1997. In 2006, she released her first full-length album, The Collection, which contains a decade of songs that she had recorded as singles for Dreamsville, including "Santa Baby," "Haunted Heart", "Water's Edge", and "God." In 2007, she released a tenth anniversary version of "Santa Baby".

Humanitarian work

Basinet has worked to draw attention to the plight of some 200,000 Sahrawi refugees living in the Western Sahara desert. In May 2001, she travelled to the Sahrawi refugee camps in Algeria to perform for the people there (who are more than 80 percent women and children). In a meeting of the United Nations Fourth Committee (also known as the Special Political and Decolonization Committee), Basinet said that long before there was an Arab Spring, there had been a "Saharan Fall", where Saharans "lived bravely and were attacked and died in violence at the hands of the Moroccan policies and perpetrated by their army."

In a later meeting of the same committee, she read the following quote. "As a single mother, I understand only too well what lack of security can do in undermining what the Saharawi believe in and wish for as a society. Their ability to withstand all for 30 years in the pursuit of self-determination is truly a role model for us all, as we enter the new millennium. For they had displayed faith, honour, compassion and resourcefulness in the face of such opposition."

In a later meeting of the same committee, she said that the Sahawari people lived in a futile faith over their future because they had agreed to a United Nations peace accord more than 16 years ago and, for more than 30 years, the majority had lived in the most uninhabitable outpost of the Algerian Sahara desert. She challenged the Committee to undertake a new mission of positive change there, mentioning specific change which should occur.

Filmography

Discography

References

External links
  Official website
 

1972 births
Living people
21st-century American singers
Actresses from Los Angeles
American television actresses
People from the San Fernando Valley
Singers from Los Angeles
21st-century American actresses